Stetten may refer to the following places:

Germany
Stetten (Achstetten), Baden-Württemberg
Stetten am kalten Markt, Baden-Württemberg
Stetten, Bodenseekreis, Baden-Württemberg
Stetten, Lörrach, Baden-Württemberg
Kernen, formerly Stetten im Remstal and Rommelshausen, Baden-Württemberg
Stetten, Bavaria
Stetten, Sondheim vor der Rhön, Bavaria
Stetten, Rhineland-Palatinate

Austria
Stetten, Austria

France
 Stetten, Haut-Rhin, a commune in Haut-Rhin

Switzerland
Stetten, Aargau
Stetten, Schaffhausen

See also
 
 German toponymy